Ronald is a masculine given name derived from the Old Norse Rögnvaldr, or possibly from Old English Regenweald. In some cases Ronald is an Anglicised form of the Gaelic Raghnall, a name likewise derived from Rögnvaldr. The latter name is composed of the Old Norse elements regin ("advice", "decision") and valdr ("ruler"). Ronald was originally used in England and Scotland, where Scandinavian influences were once substantial, although now the name is common throughout the English-speaking world. A short form of Ronald is Ron. Pet forms of Ronald include Roni and Ronnie. Ronalda and Rhonda are feminine forms of Ronald. Rhona, a modern name apparently only dating back to the late nineteenth century, may have originated as a feminine form of Ronald. The names Renaud/Renault and Reynold/Reinhold are cognates from French and German respectively. The name Ronaldo is a cognate from Spanish and Portuguese.

People with the name
 Ronald I of Buganda
 Ronald Acuña, Venezuelan baseball player
 Ronald Alcock (died 1991), British stamp dealer and philatelic speaker
 Ronalds Arājs, Latvian athlete
 Ronald Arculli, Former chairman of Hong Kong Exchanges and Clearing, Non-official Members Convenor of the Executive Council of Hong Kong (Exco) and a senior partner at King & Wood Mallesons.
 Ron Atkinson, English football manager
 Ronald Bandell (1946–2015), Dutch mayor
 Ronnie Barker (1929–2005), British comedian, known as one half of The Two Ronnies
 Ronnie Belliard, retired American baseball player
 Ronnie Biggs, British train robber
 Ron Blomberg (born 1948), American major league baseball player
 Ronald Breslow (1931–2017), American chemist
 Ronald Burkle, American businessman
 Ronnie Burns (actor), part-time actor best noted as the adopted son of George Burns and Gracie Allen
 Ronnie Burns (Australian), Australian singer
 Ronnie Burns (footballer), former Australian rules footballer with the Geelong and Adelaide Football Clubs
 Ron Butlin (ice hockey) (1925–2014), Canadian ice hockey executive
 Ronald Castree, British child murderer
 Ronald Cerritos, Salvadoran footballer
 Ronald Cheng, Hong Kong pop star and movie actor
 Ron Chernow, American writer, journalist, historian and biographer
 Ronalds Cinks, Latvian ice hockey player
 Ronald D. Coleman, American politician
 Ronald Colman, English actor
 Ronnie Corbett, British comedian, known for his role as the other half of The Two Ronnies
 Ronald de Boer, Dutch football (soccer) player
 Ronald DeFeo Jr, American mass murder and family annihilator
 Ronald dela Rosa (born 1962), Filipino politician and retired police general
 Ronald de Mel (born 1925), Sri Lanka Minister of Finance from 1977 to 1988
 Ron Dennis, British businessman
 Ron DeSantis, American politician
 Ronnie James Dio, American singer for Elf, Rainbow, Black Sabbath, Dio, and Heaven and Hell
 Ronald Fielding Dodd (c.1890–1958), Scottish architect
 Ronald Dominique (born 1964), prolific American serial killer and rapist 
 Ronald dos Santos Lopes (born 1998), Brazilian footballer
 Ronnie Drew, Irish singer and a founding member of The Dubliners
 Ron Eldard, American actor
 Ronald Evans (1933–1990), American astronaut
 Ronald Ferguson, father of Sarah, Duchess of York
 Ronald Ferguson (economist), American researcher of the racial education achievement gap
 Ronald Fisher (1890–1962),  British statistician and geneticist
 Ronald Florijn, Dutch rower
 Ronald J. Garan, Jr., American astronaut
 Ronald Girones, Cuban judoka
 Ronald Gora, American swimmer
 Ronald Green (1944-2012), American-Israeli basketball player
 Ronald "Ronnie" Kray (1933-1995), English killer and robber
 Ron McClure, Jazz bassist
 Ronald McNeill, 1st Baron Cushendun, British Conservative politician
 Ron Greenwood (1921–2006), English football player and manager
 Ron Guidry, American baseball pitcher, New York Yankees 
 Ron Hackenberger (born 1935), American businessman and car collector
 Ronald Max Hartwell, Australian historian
 Ronald Harvey (cricketer), English cricketer
 Ronald A. Heifetz, cofounder of the Center for Public Leadership at John F. Kennedy School of Government, Harvard University
 Ronald Herd, American professional wrestler
 Ronald K. Hoeflin, American philosopher
 Ronald Holassie, Trinidad and Tobago long-distance runner
 Ron Horsley, American author and illustrator
 Ronald "Ron" Howard, American filmmaker and actor
 L. Ron Hubbard (1911–1986), American author and the founder of the Church of Scientology
 Ronald Jeremy Hyatt (born 1953), American pornographic actor, filmmaker, actor, and stand-up comedian
 Ronald Isley, R&B singer
 Ron Johnson (born 1955), senior United States senator for Wisconsin
 Ronald Jones (running back) (born 1997), American football player
 Ron Jones (athlete), British track and field athlete
 Ronald Joseph, American figure skater
 Ron Keel (born 1961), heavy metal vocalist and guitarist for a number of bands from the 1980s to the modern day
 Ronalds Ķēniņš, Latvian ice hockey player
 Ron Kind, American congressman
 Ronald Klink, Democratic politician and former United States Representative from Pennsylvania
 Ronald Koeman, Dutch football (soccer) player and coach
 Ron LeFlore (athlete), Detroit Tigers
 Ronald Lacey (1935–1991) British actor
 Ronald Lanzoni, Costa Rican long-distance runner
 Dr. Ronald Leung, Hong Kong politician and businessman in banking
 Ron Mael, American musician and songwriter
 Ronald Mallett, American physicist
 Ronald Mason Jr., African-American university president
 Rónald Matarrita, Costa Rican footballer
 Ronald Méndez, Venezuelan volleyball player
 Ronald D. Moore, American screenwriter and television producer
 David Ronald Musgrove, Democratic politician and former governor of Mississippi, better known as "Ronnie Musgrove"
 Ronald Clark O'Bryan (1944-1984), American murderer
 Ronnie O'Sullivan, British snooker player
 Ronald Patrick (born 1991), American football player
 Ron Paul, Texan congressman
 Ronald Pelton, American intelligence analyst and convicted spy
 Ronald Pereira Martins (born 2001), Brazilian footballer
 Ron Perlman, American actor
 Ron Petersen (b. 1934), American mycologist using the standard author abbreviation "R.H.Petersen"
 Ronald Pofalla (born 1959), German politician and manager 
 Ronald Powell (born 1991), American football player
 Ronald van Raak (born 1969), Dutch politician
 Ronald Reagan (1911–2004), former actor, Governor of California and 40th President of the United States
 Ronald Reid-Daly (1928–2010), Rhodesian military commander
 Ronald Ringsrud, US author and emerald expert
 Ron Rivest, American cryptographer
 Ronald Santanna Rodrigues (born 1997), Brazilian footballer
 Ron Saunders (1932–2019), English football player and manager
 Ronald Scobie (1893–1969), British Army officer
 Ronald "Bon" Scott, lead singer of AC/DC from 1974 to 1980
 Ronald Schill, German judge and politician
 Ronald L. Schlicher, American diplomat
 Ronald Alan Schulz (1965–2005), American civilian contract worker killed in Iraq
 Ronnie Schneider, American Rock and roll manager
 Ronald Searle (1920–2011), British cartoonist
 Ronald "Ron" Sexmith (born 1964), Canadian singer-songwriter
 Ronald Gene Simmons (1940-1990), American spree killer and family annihilator
 Ronald Steele, American basketball player
 Ronald Stretton, British track cyclist
 John Ronald Reuel Tolkien (1892–1973), British writer
 Ronald "Ronnie" Turner (1960-2022), American actor, singer, and youngest son of Tina Turner
 Ron Underwood, American film director
 Ronnie Vannucci, Jr., American musician and member of The Killers
 Ronnie Van Zant (1948–1977), American musician 
 Ronald Venetiaan, former president of Suriname
 Ronald Virag (born 1938), French cardiovascular surgeon
 Ronald Washington (born 1952), American baseball player and manager
 Ronnie Wood, British rock musician (The Rolling Stones), and artist
 Ronald Wright (boxer) American professional boxer
 Ronalds Žagars, Latvian former football goalkeeper
 Ronald Zilberberg (born 1996), Israeli Olympic figure skater
 Ronald Zoodsma (born 1966), Dutch volleyball player

Fictional people with the name
 Ronald Miller, a character in the American teen romantic comedy 1987 film Can't Buy Me Love
 Ronald McDonald, mascot of McDonald's
 Ronald the Cat, Nature Cat's next-door neighbor and arch-enemy
 Ron Stoppable, Kim Possible's sidekick from the Disney animated series Kim Possible
 Ron Swanson, the mustachioed libertarian director of the eponymous department in the sitcom Parks and Recreation.
 Ron Weasley, a main character in Harry Potter, best friend of the title character
 Ronald "Ronnie" Raymond, half of the DC Comics superhero Firestorm.
 Ronald "Red" Daniels, main protagonist of Call of Duty: WWII.
 Ronald Knox, a reaper in the manga Black Butler by Yana Toboso

See also
 Ronaldo
 Ronaldson
 Ron
 Ronnie
 Ronny

Citations

References

Dutch masculine given names
English-language masculine given names
English masculine given names
German masculine given names
Scottish masculine given names
Swedish masculine given names